Royal Legion may refer to:
 Royal British Legion
 Royal Canadian Legion